The National Workers Union (NWU) is a general trade union in Jamaica.  The National Workers Union was founded on 2 April 1952 emerging as a result of a split within the Trade Union Congress and factional alignments within the People's National Party (PNP).  The NWU became the main trade union of the PNP. The NWU was a founding member of the Jamaica Confederation of Trade Unions.

References

External links 

History of National Workers Union

Trade unions in Jamaica
Trade unions established in 1952